This is a list of attacks by the Armenian Secret Army for the Liberation of Armenia (ASALA). Between 1975 and 1985, a total of 84 incidents were recorded: 46 people were killed and 299 injured.

References

Attacks attributed to ASALA on the START terrorism database

History of the Republic of Turkey
Armenian Secret Army for the Liberation of Armenia
Terrorist attacks attributed to Armenian militant groups